Teri Marie Harrison Rose (born February 16, 1981 in Bradenton, Florida, United States) is an American model and actress. A former student of the University of Central Florida, she was Playboy's Playmate of the Month in October 2002.   She was photographed by Stephen Wayda. Her involvement with Playboy began when her best friend encouraged her to send pictures of herself to the magazine. Although she was chosen almost immediately as a Playmate, it was a year before she was assigned a month. She was also the German Playboy Playmate of the Month, for January 2003.  According to Teri, her father is German and her mother is half-Japanese.

She appeared in the 2005 Playmates at Play at the Playboy Mansion swimsuit calendar as calendar girl of December. The calendar was the inaugural Playmates at Play calendar and it was shot on the grounds of Playboy Mansion in 2004. It was Playboy'''s first attempt at creating a non-nude swimsuit calendar featuring Playmates similar in style with those from Sports Illustrated Swimsuit Issue.

She was also a Barker's Beauty on The Price Is Right'' from 2002 to 2005.

She has appeared in radio commercials as a "remarkable mouth" for KDKB and WLZR

Harrison was married to Sevendust drummer Morgan Rose and they have a son together. They have since divorced.

References

External links

 
 

1981 births
Living people
Female models from Florida
Game show models
American people of German descent
People from Bradenton, Florida
2000s Playboy Playmates
University of Central Florida alumni
American film actresses
American models of Japanese descent
American actresses of Japanese descent
American film actors of Asian descent
21st-century American women